Javier Ortega Desio (born 14 June 1990) is an Argentine rugby union player who plays as a loose forward for the Argentine Super Rugby side , and the Argentina national rugby union team.

Career

Ortega Desio started out his professional career playing for the San Isidro Club in the Torneo de la URBA.   He spent 4 years there and racked up almost 50 appearances before switching to join Estudiantes de Paraná in his home town in 2014.

Ortega Desio is signed to play for Jaguares until 2017.

International career

Ortega Desio was a member of the Argentina Under-20 sides which competed in the 2010 IRB Junior World Championship and later went on to play for Argentina's representative teams, the Jaguars and the Pampas XV.   He was a member of the Pampas XV squad for the 2013 Vodacom Cup in South Africa and he also went on their tour of Australia in 2014.

He made his senior debut for Los Pumas against  on 20 May 2012, scoring a try in the process.   However, it wasn't until 2014 before he tasted action against non-South American opposition where he played in all 3 of his country's matches during the 2014 mid-year rugby union internationals series.

In August 2014, he was named in the squad for the 2014 Rugby Championship.

References

1990 births
Living people
Rugby union flankers
Jaguares (Super Rugby) players
Pampas XV players
Argentine rugby union players
Argentina international rugby union players
Pan American Games medalists in rugby sevens
Pan American Games silver medalists for Argentina
Rugby sevens players at the 2011 Pan American Games
Medalists at the 2011 Pan American Games
People from Paraná, Entre Ríos
Sportspeople from Entre Ríos Province